Souleymane Djimou Cissé (born 1 January 1999) is a Senegalese footballer who plays as a defender for I liga club Górnik Łęczna.

Career

Club career

In 2019, Cissé signed for the reserves of Spanish La Liga side Celta, where manager Jacobo Montes said he "has a major drawback, and that is that he does not speak Spanish and he has a significant communication problem. He only speaks French and it is not a language that the members of the coaching staff speak". In 2021, he was sent on loan to Arenteiro in the Spanish fourth division. 

In 2021, Cissé signed for French second division club Quevilly-Rouen. On 28 August 2021, he debuted for Quevilly-Rouen during a 0-1 loss to Paris FC.

On 13 August 2022, he joined Polish I liga side Górnik Łęczna on a two-year contract.

International career

He represented Senegal at the 2019 FIFA U-20 World Cup.

References

External links
 
 
 

1999 births
Living people
People from Sédhiou Region
Senegalese footballers
Senegal youth international footballers
Association football defenders
Ligue 2 players
Segunda División B players
Tercera División players
Championnat National 3 players
US Quevilly-Rouen Métropole players
Górnik Łęczna players
Senegalese expatriate footballers
Senegalese expatriate sportspeople in Spain
Senegalese expatriate sportspeople in France
Expatriate footballers in France
Expatriate footballers in Poland
Senegalese expatriate sportspeople in Poland
CD Arenteiro players